The Costa Rica national under-17 football team represents Costa Rica in international football at this age level and is controlled by the Federación Costarricense de Fútbol.

CONCACAF U-17 Championship record

CONCACAF U-17 Championship record
 1983: Did not enter
 1985: Runners-up
 1987: Third place
 1988: First stage
 1991: Did not enter
 1992: First stage
 1994: Champions
 1996: Third place
 1999: Third place Group A
 2001: First place Group B
 2003: First place Group B
 2005: Second place Group A (won qualifying playoff)•
 2007: Second place Group B
 2009: Second place Group B (tournament interrupted)
 2011: Quarter-finals
 2013: Group stage
 2015: Final stage - Won qualifying playoff
 2017: Classification stage - Second place Group E
 2019: Quarter-finals
 2023: Round of 16
 From 1983 until 1991, competition was U-16, not U-17
 In 2009 the tournament was interrupted due to the swine flu, but Costa Rica obtained a spot for the U-17 World Cup.
•Tournaments from 1999 to 2007 followed a two group format. No championship game took place and no standings were given. The top teams in their respective groups qualified and the second placed teams played in a playoff to decide the final seed.

FIFA U-17 World Cup record

FIFA U-17 World Cup record

* Denotes draws include knockout matches decided on penalty kicks.

Schedule

Record versus other nations

Honours
CONCACAF Under-17 Championship
 Winners (1): 1994
 Runners-up (1): 1985

Current squad
The following 21 players were called for the 2017 FIFA U-17 World Cup in India from 6-28 of October 2017.

Central American national under-17 association football teams
Costa Rica national football team

See also
 Costa Rica national football team
 Costa Rica national under-23 football team
 Costa Rica national under-20 football team
 Costa Rica at the FIFA World Cup